Vladislav Titov (born 10 February 1997 in Novosibirsk) is a Russian professional squash player. As of May 2021, he was ranked number 209 in the world.

References

1997 births
Living people
Russian squash players
Sportspeople from Novosibirsk